Leptospermum arachnoides, commonly known as the spidery tea-tree, is a species of shrub that is endemic to eastern Australia. It has rough bark, crowded linear to lance-shaped leaves with a sharp point on the end, white flowers and hairy fruit.

Description
Flowering occurs from November to January and the fruit is a hairy capsule  in diameter.

Taxonomy and naming
Leptospermum arachnoides was first formally described in 1788 by Joseph Gaertner in his book De Fructibus et Seminibus Plantarum. The specific epithet (‘’arachnoides’’) is derived from  Latin, meaning "resembling a spider".

Distribution and habitat
Spidery tea-tree grows in moist heath and sclerophyll forest, usually on shallow soils derived from sandstone and granite. It occurs between south-east Queensland and the Tinderry Range in New South Wales.

References

arachnoides
Myrtales of Australia
Flora of New South Wales
Flora of Queensland
Plants described in 1788